Lunge refer to:
 Lunge (exercise), a weight training exercise
 Lunge (fencing), the fundamental offensive fencing technique
 Longeing, also spelled Lungeing or Lunging, a technique for training horses where a horse is asked to work at the end of a long line
 Lunge (surname), a surname
 Lunge feeding, an extreme feeding method used by some whales
 "LUNGE", a song by Susumu Hirasawa from Detonator Orgun 2

Places
Lunge, Angola, a commune in the municipality of Bailundo, province of Huambo, Angola

See also
 Longe (disambiguation)
 Lung (disambiguation)